Ceriagrion varians is a species of damselfly in the family Coenagrionidae. It is found in Angola, Cameroon, the Republic of the Congo, the Democratic Republic of the Congo, Ivory Coast, Guinea, Guinea-Bissau, Kenya, Nigeria, Uganda, and Zambia. Its natural habitats are subtropical or tropical moist lowland forests, subtropical or tropical swamps, shrub-dominated wetlands, freshwater marshes, and intermittent freshwater marshes.

References

 Clausnitzer, V. 2005.  Ceriagrion varians.   2006 IUCN Red List of Threatened Species.   Downloaded on 9 August 2007.

Coenagrionidae
Insects described in 1941
Taxonomy articles created by Polbot